Lokmanya Tilak Terminus–Banaras Express is a Express train of the Indian Railways connecting Lokmanya Tilak Terminus Kurla in Maharashtra and Banaras of Uttar Pradesh. It is currently being operated with 12167/12168 train numbers on a daily basis. The train is converted ICF coaches into LHB coaches in year 2023.

Service

The 12167/Lokmanya Tilak Terminus–Banaras Express has an average speed of 55 km/hr and covers 1475 km in 26 hrs 50 mins. 12168/Banaras–Lokmanya Tilak Terminus Express has an average speed of 58 km/hr and covers 1496 km in 26 hrs 20 mins.

Route and halts 

The important halts of the train are:

 
 
 
 
 
 
 
 
 
 
 
 
 Prayagraj Chheoki
 Varanasi Junction 
 Banaras

Coach composite

The train has standard LHB rakes with max speed of 160 kmph. The train consists of 24 coaches :

 1 AC I Tier + II Tier
 1 AC II Tier
 4 AC III Tier
 11 Sleeper Coaches
 4 General
 1 Pantry Car
 2 Second-class Luggage/parcel van

Traction

Both trains are hauled by an Electric Loco Shed, Itarsi based WAP-7 electric locomotive from Lokmanya Tilak Terminus to  Banaras and vice versa.

See also 

 Lokmanya Tilak Terminus
 Varanasi Junction railway station
 Ratnagiri Superfast Express
 Lokmanya Tilak Terminus–Gorakhpur Express

Notes

External links 

 12167/Mumbai LTT–Manduadih SF Express
 12168/Manduadih–Mumbai LTT SF Express

References 

Passenger trains originating from Varanasi
Transport in Mumbai
Rail transport in Maharashtra
Rail transport in Madhya Pradesh
Railway services introduced in 2009
Express trains in India